Rabbi Yisroel Friedman (November 28, 1936 – April 1, 2020) was a member of the Central Committee of Chabad-Lubavitch Rabbis and the rosh yeshiva of the Oholei Torah Talmudical Seminary in Brooklyn, New York.

Early life
Friedman was born in Beshenkovichi in then Byelorussia, Soviet Union on November 28, 1936 to Yaakov and Gittel. His father was a graveyard worker, unofficial communal rabbi and was killed in World War II while fighting in the Russian Army. His mother was a seamstress. Friedman's mother then fled with her family to Samarkand, Uzbekistan and then Germany and France before moving to Israel.

Teaching career
In 1956 he moved to New York. In 1959 he began teaching the Chabad yeshiva in Newark, New Jersey. In 1965 he began teaching in the Oholei Torah Talmudical Seminary. He was known for his sharp intellect, argumentative teaching style and expertise in analyzing Rashi's commentaries.

Death
Friedman died on April 1, 2020 from COVID-19. He was predeceased by his wife who died in 2014.

References

1936 births
2020 deaths
21st-century American rabbis
20th-century American rabbis
Rosh yeshivas
Soviet emigrants to the United States
American people of Belarusian-Jewish descent
People from Beshankovichy District
Deaths from the COVID-19 pandemic in New York (state)